Vladimir Skočajić (born 11 November 1954) is Bosnian football manager and former player. A winger, is most famous for his playing for FK Velež from Mostar, where he scored 48 goals in 153 matches.

Playing career
Skočajić started his career in FK Velež Mostar. He is known for scoring 4 goals against strong Dinamo Zagreb. The game ended 9–2, and symbolically, it happened on 9 February 1980. He is one of the two Velež players, the other being Vladimir Matijević, who won the Yugoslav Cup twice, in 1981 and 1986. Nicknamed Taramba, he moved to Greece to play for Apollon Kalamarias.

He finished his career because of a serious car accident. His recovery lasted for four months.

References

External links
data at RSSSF
data at RSSSF

1954 births
Living people
Sportspeople from Mostar
Croats of Bosnia and Herzegovina
Association football wingers
Bosnia and Herzegovina footballers
Yugoslav footballers
NK Lokomotiva Zagreb players
FK Velež Mostar players
FK Igman Konjic players
HNK Čapljina players
Apollon Pontou FC players
Yugoslav First League players
Super League Greece players
Bosnia and Herzegovina football managers
HŠK Zrinjski managers
Premier League of Bosnia and Herzegovina managers
Yugoslav expatriate footballers
Yugoslav expatriate sportspeople in Greece
Expatriate footballers in Greece